Serdar Annaorazow (born 29 June 1990) is a Turkmen footballer currently playing as a right back for  Nebitçi Balkanabat.

He has been capped for the national team 39 times.

Club career 
He began his career at HTTU Aşgabat. In 2014, he moved to the FC Altyn Asyr.

In March 2021, Annaorazow signed for club Nebitçi Balkanabat.

International career 

He made his debut for the national team of Turkmenistan on 28 July 2008, in a qualifying match for the 2010 World Cup against the Indonesian national team, he came on as a substitute in the second half.

In December 2018, he was included in the bid for the 2019 Asian Cup.

References

External links

Turkmenistan footballers
Turkmenistan international footballers
1990 births
Living people
Association football fullbacks
2019 AFC Asian Cup players